Ron D. Carlisle (born October 28, 1940) is an American politician in the state of North Dakota. He represented the 30th district in the North Dakota State Senate. A Republican, Carlisle was appointed to the Senate in 2011. He previously sat in the North Dakota House of Representatives from 1991 to his defeat in 2008. From 1976 to 2000, he was a delegate to the North Dakota State Republican Convention. He attended Bismarck State College and Black Hills State College and holds Bachelor of Arts and Bachelor of Science degrees and is a former businessman. He also served in the United States Navy.

References

Republican Party North Dakota state senators
Republican Party members of the North Dakota House of Representatives
1940 births
Living people
Politicians from Bismarck, North Dakota
21st-century American politicians